Christos Christodoulou (born August 13, 1961) is a Greek former professional basketball player. At a height of 2.00 m (6' 6") tall, he played at the small forward and power forward positions.

Professional career
After playing with the youth teams of Dafni, Christodoulou played at the senior level with Panionios, with whom he won the Greek Cup title in 1991. In 1994, he moved to Sporting.

National team career
Christodoulou was a member of the senior men's Greek national basketball team that finished in 10th place at the 1986 FIBA World Championship.

Post-playing career
After he retired from playing professional basketball, Christodoulou worked as the sports manager of the Greek Basket League club Panionios.

Personal life
Christodoulou's younger brother, Fanis, was also a professional basketball player. They played together in the same club team, Panionios.

References

External links 
FIBA Archive Profile
FIBA Europe Profile
Eurobasket.com Profile
Hellenic Federation Profile 

1961 births
Living people
1986 FIBA World Championship players
Greek basketball executives and administrators
Greek Basket League players
Greek men's basketball players
Panionios B.C. players
Power forwards (basketball)
Small forwards
Sporting basketball players
Basketball players from Athens